Talise may refer to:

Talise language
Talise Trevigne, American operatic soprano

See also
TALISE